"Houses in Motion" is the second and final single from Remain in Light, the fourth studio album by American new wave band Talking Heads. An alternate mix of the song was released in vinyl form on 5 May 1981 and peaked at number 50 on the UK Singles Chart.

Recording and style 
Talking Heads frontman and chief lyricist David Byrne remixed the song created with Remain in Light producer Brian Eno at Compass Point Studios in the Bahamas in the summer of 1980. "Houses in Motion" features brass performances by Jon Hassell. The B-side "Air" is from the band's third studio album Fear of Music. The cover artwork is by designer Thomi Wroblewski.

The song incorporates lengthy brass performances from Jon Hassell.

Track listing 
 "Houses in Motion" – 4:33
 "Air" – 3:34
 The 12" version included an extra live version of "Houses of Motion".

Chart positions

Live performance
Talking Heads regularly performed the song live from August 1980 to December 1983. A recording from November 1980 at the Emerald City club in Cherry Hill, New Jersey was included on their 1982 live album, The Name of This Band Is Talking Heads.
Byrne also performed the song throughout his 2008-2009 Songs of David Byrne and Brian Eno Tour, with a performance featuring in the 2010 documentary film Ride, Rise, Roar.

References

Talking Heads songs
1981 singles
Songs written by David Byrne
Songs written by Brian Eno
Sire Records singles
Song recordings produced by Brian Eno
Songs written by Jerry Harrison
Songs written by Chris Frantz
Songs written by Tina Weymouth
1980 songs